Legally Blonde (stylized as LEGALLY blonde) is an American media franchise created by Amanda Brown. It consists of American comedy films, a Broadway musical, a reality television series, and a cancelled television series. The films include two theatrical releases, one musical television film, one straight-to-home video release, and a third theatrical film in development. The installments follow the comical adventures of Elle Woods, portrayed by actress Reese Witherspoon in the films, a blonde California University of Los Angeles sorority president, who enrolls in law school.

Origin

The media franchise is based on the 2001 novel, Legally Blonde, written by Amanda Brown. The novel was based on Brown's experiences while enrolled in Stanford Law School.

Elle Woods, a blonde University of Southern California sorority president and homecoming queen, is deeply in love with her college sweetheart, Warner Huntington III. When Warner enrolls in Harvard Law School and aims to find a girl more serious than Elle to be his wife, Elle schemes a plan to follow him there to win him back.

Films

Feature films

Legally Blonde (2001)

Former Sorority President Elle Woods is happy and in love with her boyfriend. She wants nothing more than to be married, and become Mrs. Warner Huntington III. Huntington, however will not propose stating that she is "too blonde". Determined to win him over, and prove to herself that there's more to her than her looks, Elle rallies all of her resources and applies for the law program at Harvard University.

Legally Blonde 2: Red, White & Blonde (2003)

Elle travels to Washington, D.C., determined to present her stance for animal rights. Ignored by every one she encounters, she learns that the Capitol can be more difficult to navigate than The Ivy League university law school from which she attained her J.D. degree. After befriending, and gaining the sympathy of a Republican politician named Victoria Rudd, Elle attains the chance of getting to present her arguments. To make a difference, she must convince the Legislature to take her seriously.

Legally Blonde 3 (TBA)
In June 2018, Reese Witherspoon entered negotiations with Metro-Goldwyn-Mayer to produce and star in a third installment in the Legally Blonde film series. Karen McCullah Lutz and Kirsten Smith were hired as co-screenwriters. MGM later confirmed in a Twitter post that Legally Blonde 3 was set to be released on May 8, 2020, though it did not meet this date. In May 2020, it was announced that Mindy Kaling and Dan Goor would write an entirely new script for the film.

Television films

Legally Blonde (2003)
Originally filmed as the pilot episode of a cancelled television series, Legally Blonde aired through private viewing television in 2003. Jennifer Hall stars as Elle Woods, with the series intended to adapt the many misadventures she encountered as a former-sorority sister at Harvard University. The network executives ultimately passed on ordering a season for the series. In 2017, the film was widely released on YouTube as a television film, and was received with negative reviews.

Legally Blonde: The Musical (2007)

Three performances of the Broadway musical was filmed and aired on MTV in 2007. The television adaptation was co-directed by Beth McCarthy-Miller and Jerry Mitchell, from a script by Heather Hach, with music and lyrics were co-written by Laurence O'Keefe and Nell Benjamin.

Legally Blondes (2009)

With Elle Woods away as a successful lobbyist in Washington D.C., her two younger British cousins Annabelle "Annie" Woods and Isabelle "Izzy" Woods (played by Camilla and Rebecca Rosso) move to California to live in her home. The pair learn that they will be attending the Pacific Preparatory School and they upset the dominant social set of their fashion tastes and personalities. Originally intended as the pilot film of a cancelled television series, Legally Blondes began airing on ABC Family and Disney Channel on April 28, 2009, simultaneous with a direct-to-DVD release.

Cast and characters 
 A dark gray cell indicates that the character was not in the film or that the character's presence in the film has yet to be announced.
 An  indicates an appearance through archival footage or stills.
 A  indicates a cameo role.
 A  indicates an uncredited role.
 A  indicates a photographic role.

Reality series

A reality competition television series in conjunction with the musical titled Legally Blonde: The Musical – The Search for Elle Woods debuted on MTV in 2008. The show debuted on June 2, 2008 as a competition show, where the winner would be cast in the lead role. Bailey Hanks ultimately won, and in addition to being cast in the starring role, was given the opportunity to record her own single of the musical's first-act number titled, "So Much Better". The show concluded on July 21, 2008. Autumn Hurlbert was the runner up. She served as Hanks' understudy and performed in the ensemble of the show. Bundy's last performance in the musical was on July 20, 2008. Hanks began performances on July 23, 2008 and remained with the show until it closed on October 19, 2008.

Stage

A Legally Blonde musical debuted in 2007, with music and lyrics by Laurence O'Keefe and Nell Benjamin and book by Heather Hach. It premiered in pre-Broadway tryouts in San Francisco, California. In April 2007 the show moved to Broadway, opening to mixed reviews. Jerry Mitchell directed and choreographed. The original cast starred Laura Bell Bundy as Elle, Christian Borle as Emmett and Richard H. Blake as Warner. It received seven Tony nominations and ten Drama Desk nominations but did not win any.

Novels
Following the release of the feature film, a series of teenage novels based jointly on the original book and the film series followed. Written by Natalie Standiford, the book series follows the continued adventures of Elle Woods.

Reception

Box office and financial performance

Critical response

References

External links
 
 
 
 

Comedy film franchises
English-language novels
American feminist films
Film series introduced in 2001
Fiction about government
Metro-Goldwyn-Mayer films
Metro-Goldwyn-Mayer franchises
Series of books
2000s feminist films
 
2000s English-language films
2020s English-language films
2000s American films